The Voice in the Fog is a lost 1915 silent film produced by Jesse Lasky and distributed by Paramount Pictures. J. P. McGowan directed the film which is based on a novel by Harold McGrath. Stage actor Donald Brian makes his screen debut in the film.

Cast
Donald Brian as Thomas Webb
Adda Gleason as Kitty Killigrew
Frank O'Connor as Mason (as Frank A. Connor)
George Gebhardt as Mason's assistant
Florence Smythe as Mrs. Killigrew
Ernest Joy as Mr. Killigrew

References

External links

1915 films
American silent feature films
Films directed by J. P. McGowan
Lost American films
Films based on American novels
Paramount Pictures films
American mystery films
American black-and-white films
1915 lost films
Lost mystery films
1910s American films
Silent mystery films